Nogometni klub Hrvatski dragovoljac, commonly referred to as NK Hrvatski dragovoljac or simply Hrvatski dragovoljac, is a Croatian football club based in the Novi Zagreb neighbourhood of the country's capital city of Zagreb. The team's fans are known as the "Black Warriors". The club's home ground is Stadion NŠC Stjepan Spajić, which has a capacity of 5,000.

History
The club was founded in 1975 as NK Trnsko 75, with its name being changed to ONK Novi Zagreb in 1976 and NK Novi Zagreb in 1990.

When the Croatian War of Independence began in 1991, many of the club's members volunteered to fight. In honour of those who fought and those who lost their lives in the war, the club was renamed Hrvatski Dragovoljac (Croatian Volunteer) when they resumed play in 1994. They also adopted a new logo incorporating black as the team's colour.

In 1995, the club won promotion to the former Croatian First B-League, where they finished first and qualified for the championship play-off of the Prva HNL in 1996, finishing fifth in the end. In 1997, the club reached the third place in the Prva HNL and qualified for the UEFA Intertoto Cup, a success they repeated in the following two seasons with fourth and fifth-place finishes.

Name changes
NK Trnsko '75 (1975–1976)
ONK Novi Zagreb (1976–1990)
NK Novi Zagreb (1990–1994)
NK Hrvatski Dragovoljac (1994–present)

Honours
Croatian Second League
Champions (2): 1994–95 (West), 2012–13

Recent seasons

Key

Top scorer shown in bold when he was also top scorer for the division.

P = Played
W = Games won
D = Games drawn
L = Games lost
F = Goals for
A = Goals against
Pts = Points
Pos = Final position

1. HNL = Prva HNL
2. HNL = Druga HNL
3. HNL = Treća HNL

GS = Group Stage
PR = Preliminary round
R1 = Round 1
R2 = Round 2
QF = Quarter-finals
SF = Semi-finals
RU = Runners-up
W  = Winners

Players

Current squad

Out on loan

European record

Summary

Source: uefa.com, Last updated on 10 September 2010Pld = Matches played; W = Matches won; D = Matches drawn; L = Matches lost; GF = Goals for; GA = Goals against. Defunct competitions indicated in italics.

By season

Player records
Most appearances in UEFA club competitions: 8 appearances
 Nikica Miletić
Top scorers in UEFA club competitions: 2 goals
 Mario Bazina
 Neno Katulić

Notable coaches

 Branko Tucak (1998–1999)
 Milivoj Bračun (2000)
 Gordan Ciprić (2006–07)
 Stjepan Čordaš (2007)
 Vjekoslav Lokica (2007–2008)
 Albert Pobor (2008–2009)
 Damir Mužek (2009–2010)
 Davor Mladina (2010)
 Damir Biškup (interim) (2010)
 Ivan Pudar (2010)
 Davor Mladina (2010–2011)
 Damir Biškup (2011)
 Stjepan Čordaš (2011)
 Zdenko Glumac (2011)
 Dinko Vulelija (2011)
 Krešimir Sunara (2011–2013)
 Krešimir Ganjto (2013)
 Davor Mladina (2013–2014)
 Roy Ferenčina (2014–2015)
 Besnik Prenga (2015)
 Iztok Kapušin (2015)
 Dean Klafurić (2019)

References

External links
Official website 
Hrvatski Dragovoljac at Nogometni magazin 

 
Football clubs in Croatia
Association football clubs established in 1975
Hrvatski Dragovoljac
1975 establishments in Croatia